The main ridge of the Taunus refers to a 75-kilometre-long ridgeline in the High Taunus mountain in Germany, whose geological core consists of veins of hard Taunus quartzite and which separates the steeply descending Anterior Taunus to the south from the more gradually descending upland of the Hintertaunus or Farther Taunus in the north. The watershed between the Upper Rhine and River Main to the south and the Middle Rhine tributaries of the Wisper and Lahn to the north, runs for long sections along the main ridge. Several of the river flowing southwards have broken through the rock of the Taunus ridge unit in several places so that the watershed is diverted a few kilometres to the north. 

The main ridge of the Taunus is also a watershed that, especially in the cooler six months of the year and during inversion weather conditions, separates the fog in the Upper Rhine Plain from clearer weather in the north. When the prevailing winds are from the northwest, the ridge receives a lot of precipitation and shelters the Rhine-Main region, giving it a mild climate.

Route 

The main crest of the Taunus runs from southwest to northeast from the Middle Rhine to the Wetterau in the following natural region sections:

 301 High Taunus
 301.0 Niederwald
 301.1 Rheingau Hills (Rheingaugebirge)
 301.2 Wiesbaden High Taunus
 301.3 Feldberg-Taunus Crest
 301.4 Winterstein-Taunus Crest
 301.5 Nauheim Taunus Spur

Der main ridge of the Taunus incorporates the crest of the Hunsrück west of the Rhine and the heights of Bingen Forest.

References

Literature 
Alexander Stahr, Birgit Bender: Der Taunus-Eine Zeitreise. Stuttgart, 2007, 
Eugen Ernst: Der Taunus – Ein L(i)ebenswertes Mittelgebirge. Frankfurt, 2009, 
Alexander Stahr: Die Böden des Taunuskamms. Entwicklung-Verbreitung-Nutzung-Gefährdung. Munich, 2014, 

High Taunus